The Knights of Meaford are a Canadian junior ice hockey team based in Meaford, Ontario, Canada.  They play in the Greater Metro Junior A Hockey League (GMHL).

History

The Knights of Meaford joined the GMHL in spring 2013. The Knights are the first junior team in Meaford since the Meaford Monarchs of the Mid-Ontario Junior C Hockey League in the late 1970s.

On September 8, 2013, the Knights traveled to Burlington, Ontario, to play their first game against the Halton Ravens.  Despite trailing 6–3 in the second period, the Knights rallied to win the game 9–8.  Zach Newman scored the first goal in team history at 3:52 of the first period. Jesse Martel picked up the win in net for the Knights. On October 17, 2013, the Knights played their first home game defeating the Lefroy Wave 5–3 in front of a sold out crowd.  Connor Long picked up the eventual game-winning goal.

Season-by-season standings

References

External links

Knights Webpage
GMHL Webpage

2013 establishments in Ontario
Ice hockey clubs established in 2013
Ice hockey teams in Ontario
Grey County